Ashlee Savona  (born 12 December 1992) is a women's international footballer who plays as a midfielder. Born in Canada, she represented the Guyana national team.

College career
Savona was honored as an all-Southland Conference performer during her junior and senior seasons. She was also the first Northwestern State University player to play on a national team when she was named to the Guyana national squad in 2010, since her mother came from Guyana. She was part of the team at the 2016 CONCACAF Women's Olympic Qualifying Championship.

After four years at Northwestern, where she obtained her bachelor's degree in Accounting, Savona joined University of Alabama in Huntsville as an assistant coach.

Club career
In 2015, Savona played for ProStars FC in League1 Ontario.

International career
In 2008, she was recruited to the Guyana national team after her father was introduced to the head coach of the new program. She debuted in 2010 when the team formally began play. She later returned to the senior team in 2016 at the 2016 CONCACAF Women's Olympic Qualifying Championship, for the first time since 2010.

In 2011, she played and was named co-captain of the Guyana U20.

International goals
Scores and results list Guyana's goal tally first

See also
List of Guyana women's international footballers

References

External links

1992 births
Living people
Citizens of Guyana through descent
Guyanese women's footballers
Women's association football midfielders
Northwestern State Lady Demons soccer players
Guyana women's international footballers
Guyanese expatriate footballers
Guyanese expatriate sportspeople in the United States
Expatriate women's soccer players in the United States
Soccer players from Mississauga
Canadian women's soccer players
Canadian expatriate women's soccer players
Canadian expatriate sportspeople in the United States
Canadian sportspeople of Guyanese descent
ProStars FC players
League1 Ontario (women) players
Toronto Lady Lynx players